Mounaïm El Idrissy (born 10 February 1999) is a French professional footballer who plays as a forward for  club Ajaccio.

Career
El Idrissy made his professional debut with Ajaccio in a 3–2 Ligue 2 win over Le Havre on 19 October 2018.

Personal life
Born in France, El Idrissy is of Moroccan descent.

References

External links
 
 

1999 births
Living people
People from Martigues
Sportspeople from Bouches-du-Rhône
French sportspeople of Moroccan descent
French footballers
Footballers from Provence-Alpes-Côte d'Azur
Association football forwards
Ligue 1 players
Ligue 2 players
Championnat National 3 players
AC Ajaccio players